Cottinae is a subfamily of ray-finned fishes belonging to the family Cottidae, the typical sculpins. The subfamily has species throughout the northern hemisphere in both marine and freshwater habitats.

Genera
The following genera are included within the subfamily Cottinae:

References

Cottidae
Taxa named by Charles Lucien Bonaparte
Ray-finned fish subfamilies